Pasodoble (Spanish: double step) is a fast-paced Spanish military march used by infantry troops. Its speed allowed troops to give 120 steps per minute (double the average of a regular unit, hence its name). This military march gave rise recently to a modern Spanish dance, a musical genre including both voice and instruments, and a genre of instrumental music often played during bullfight. Both the dance and the non martial compositions are also called pasodoble.

Structure 
All pasodobles have binary rhythm. Its musical structure consists of an introduction based on the dominant chord of the piece, followed by a first fragment based on the main tone and a second part, called "the trío", based on the sub-dominant note, based yet again on the dominant chord. Each change is preceded by a brieph. The last segment of the pasodoble is usually "the trío" strongly played.
The different types of pasodoble- popular, taurino, militar- can vary in rhythm, with the taurine pasodobles being the slowest and the popular being faster and often incorporating voice.
Pasodoble as we know it started in Spain but is now played in a wide variety of Hispanic nations. Each region has developed its own subgenre and personal style of pasodoble, adjusting some formal aspects of the structure to fit their local musical tradition.
In modern Spain, the most prolific composition of pasodobles is happening in the Levantine coast, associated to the festivals of Moors and Christians.

In the dance form is very free regarding figures. The dancers must remain one in front of the other, and keep their bodies parallel to each other at all times, lining slightly to the left. They must give one step per tempo. The left hand of the male and the right hand of the woman must remain united almost permanently. Besides this, almost all motions and figures are accepted, which allows space for dramatization. The dance can be similar to the one-step, except for the speed and number of steps given.

History 
The origin of this passionate form of music is disputed.

The facts known about it from historical evidence are that it was written as early as the 18th century, since Spain has pasodoble scores dating back to 1780; that it was incorporated into comedies and adopted as a regulatory step for the Spanish infantry; and that the music was not introduced into bullfights until the 19th century.

One hypothesis suggests, based on the etymology of the name, that it comes from the French "pas-redouble", a form of speedy march of the French infantry during the late 18th century. It is calimed to have both Spanish and French characteristics. The modern steps often contain French terms, but the dance resembles the nature of the bullfight. It is said to have emerged from southern French culture during the 1930s. Supporters of this hypothesis, mostly French musicologists, suggested that pasodoble was a way for the French to portray the techniques used in Spanish bullfights. This hypothesis neglects to explain the presence of scores dating from 1780, that Spanish infantry already marched at double speed before the French army did and French musicologist usually refers the bullfight-related movements or themes, peculiarity that does not make sense since in Spain it was associated with bullfighting a long time later.

A hypothesis based on the dance's free figures and rhythm states that its binary rhythm and moderated movement points to an origin in traditional Spanish music and dances of the early 16th century. These dances, developed around 1538, were a gradual combination of Castillian music and dance (seguidillas) with the "garrotín", a fast and repetitive Romani couples dance, adapted into a march form.

Famous musicologist José Subirá considers that the origin of the style was a combination of military marches and light music from Spanish popular theatre, that gradually permeated the "entremeses" of more respectable plays.

Others
Famous bullfighters have been honored with pasodoble tunes named for them. Other tunes have been inspired by patriotic motifs or local characters. The pasodoble is well-known and used today for dance competitions.

During the early 20th century, the pasodoble became part of the repertoire of Italian American musicians in San Francisco playing in the ballo liscio style. Four pasodobles were collected by Sidney Robertson Cowell for the WPA California Folk Music Project in 1939 by Mexican American wedding party band on mandolin, guitar, and violin.

Types of pasodoble

By objective

March pasodoble 
Also called "military pasodoble", it was created as, or keeps its role as, an infantry march. It is usually fast and lacks lyrics. Famous examples are "Soldadito español", "El Abanico", "Los nardos", "Las Corsarias" or " Los Voluntarios"

Taurine pasodoble 
Often played during bullfights, or with that intense atmosphere in mind. They are slowed and more dramatic than martial pasodobles, and lack lyrics, too. This pasodoble is based on music played at bullfights during the bullfighters' entrance (paseo), or during the passes (faena) just before the kill. It is also composed to honor outstanding bullfighters. Some of the most famous are  Suspiros de España, España cañí, Agüero, La Gracia de Dios,1 El Gato Montés, Viva el pasodoble, Tercio de Quites, Pan y toros, Cielo Andaluz, La Morena de mi Copla, Francisco Alegre, Amparito Roca, El Beso, Plaza de las Ventas.

Popular pasodoble 
Made to dance in popular celebrations and social reunions. They tend to be upbeat, but can also be emotional and introspective, with the occasional melancholic or patriotic theme. They usually require a small number of instruments and musicians and have lyrics. Some famous examples are "Islas Canarias", "En er Mundo", "Costa Dorada" or "Valencia".

Band pasodoble 
Pasodobles that require an entire band to be played, and are almost exclusively designed for popular parades and village celebrations. They often use colorful characters of the region and light hearted subjects as inspiration. This pasodobles are very alive in Spain, Today, the largest center for the mass production and creation of new pasodobles is the southeast of Spain, mainly the Valencian Community, related to the popular Moors and Christians festivals. The traditional ones can be heard in Spanish popular celebrations, patron saint verbenas, and weddings. Well known examples are "Paquito el Chocolatero", "Fiesta en Benidorm", "Alegría Agostense" or "Pirata Quiero Ser".

Display pasodoble 
A pasodoble performed mostly for spectacle purposes, sometimes in a bullfighting ring. This pasodoble may or may not have lyrics, but it often adapts other styles of pasodoble and just changes the dancing to make it more spectacular for the public – often tourists. Essentially, this pasodoble dance involves role-playing. This two-person dance form has the man performing as the bullfighter and the woman as the cape. It is known as one of the fastest Latin ballroom dances because dancers make around 120 to 130 beats/steps per minute. In some versions, the man portrays the matador in the dance, and the woman portrays the bull. Flamenco-like qualities infuse the dance as the man and woman challenge each other. 
The leader of this dance plays the part of the matador. The follower generally plays the part of the matador's cape, but can also represent the shadow of the matador, as well as the flamenco dancer in some figures. The follower never represents the bull, although this is a common misconception.
This form of pasodoble is a lively style of dance to the duple meter march-like music, and is often performed in the context of theater. This form of pasodoble was mistakenly taken as the original form by English and French musicologists visiting Spain in the 20th century.

Tunas 
Tunas is the name given to a brotherhood of students that play popular music together on the street to get some extra coins, or under the window of the beloved of one of them, to try and help the lovestruck member to get a date with her. Tunas have become one of the main forces keeping Spanish pasodoble alive. Tunas tend to adapt or repeat simple pieces that are already composed, but they sometimes compose their own, satirical pieces.

By region
In addition to the Spanish pasodoble, already discussed, this rhythm has been adopted and modified by other nations:

Mexican pasodoble 
Mexico has produced master composers of pasodoble, especially taurine pasodobles. Agustín Lara or Silverio Pérez. Some of the best known Mexican pasodobles are

El Piti, El Charro Cárdenas, El abuelito, El banderillero, María Caballé, El Berrendito de San Juan, Tarde de toros, Toros en San Miguel, Joselito Huerta and Toros de Llaguno.

Puerto Rican pasodobles 
Puerto Rican pasodobles are known for their nostalgic quality.
Some of the most famous are: Ecos de Puerto Rico (El Maestro Ladi),  Morena (Noro Morales), Cuando pienso en España (Juan Peña Reyes), Reminiscencias (Juan Peña Reyes), El trueno (Juan Peña Reyes), Himno a Humacao (Miguel López), Sol andaluz (Manuel Peña Vázquez).

Colombian pasodobles 
Pasodoble is not as popular in Colombia as in other countries, but the Colombia pasodoble, "Feria de Manizales", is an emblematic piece. It was composed in 1957, with lyrics by Guillermo González Ospina and music by Juan Mari Asins inspired by the Spanish classic "España Cañi". This pasodoble is based on the development of a parade and a dance with every single "Queen of the city" of Manizales, and it lasts one week.

Spanish pasodobles 

Amparito Roca
El Beso
La Entrada
El gato montés ("Wild Cat") from the opera with the same name
El Relicario
 No te vayas de Navarra
Agüero
España cañí ("Gypsy Spain")
Islas Canarias named after Canary Islands.
La Gracia de Dios
 Feria de Manizales (unofficial hymn of the Colombian City, Manizales)
Manolete, named after Manolete.
La Morena de mi Copla
Plaza de las Ventas
Paquito el Chocolatero. The tune has a dance of its own.
Sombreros y Mantilles
Suspiros de España
 Que Viva España
Valencia
La Virgen de la Macarena
Pasodoble hace salir el sol (The pasodoble makes the sun come up)

Ballroom

Many pasodoble songs are variations of España Cañi. The song has breaks or "highlights" in fixed positions in the song (two highlights at syllabus levels, three highlights and a longer song at open levels). Highlights emphasize music and are more powerful than other parts of the music. Usually, dancers strike a dramatic pose and then hold position until the end of the highlight. Traditionally, pasodoble routines are choreographed to match these highlights, as well as the musical phrases. Accordingly, most ballroom pasodoble tunes are written with similar highlights (those without are simply avoided in competition).

Because of its heavily choreographed tradition, ballroom pasodoble is danced mostly competitively, almost never socially, or without a previously learned routine. That said, in Spain, France, Vietnam, Colombia, Costa Rica and some parts of Germany, it is danced socially as a led (unchoreographed) dance. In Venezuela, pasodoble is almost a must-have dance in weddings and big parties. It became especially famous thanks to the hit song "Guitarra Española" by Los Melódicos.

This dance gained popularity in the US in 1930. It was too difficult to achieve widespread popularity. All moves are sharp and quick. Pasodoble takes up a lot of space, limiting it to special occasions.

In competitive dance, modern pasodoble is combined with other four dances (samba, cha-cha-cha, rumba and jive) under the banner International Latin. Modern pasodoble dance consists of two dancing parts and one break in between for dancers of class D and of three parts and two breaks in between for dancers of class C, B, A, according to the IDSF classification. Dancers of lower than D-class usually perform only four official dances of the Latin-American Program.

See also
Military step
Latin dance

References

External links
 Amparito Roca Video https://www.youtube.com/watch?v=OcnQqK6-qCc Note that while this Wikipedia article specifies a tempo of no more than 120 beats per minute for a Paso Doble, this performance is much faster, at about 156 beats per minute.
 Amparito Roca Audio https://www.youtube.com/watch?v=N5BaunXbM-U This authentic interpretation by the Municipal Band of Madrid is performed at about 108 beats per minute.
 Maestro Manuel Lillo 'Plaza de las Ventas' Score
 
 

Spanish military marches
Ballroom dance
Latin dances
Spanish words and phrases
Spanish folk music
Spanish music
Bullfighting
Dance forms in classical music
Spanish dances
Dance terminology